Actinoplanes couchii is a Gram-positive bacterium from the genus Actinoplanes which has been isolated from soil from the Marmore waterfalls in Italy.

References

External links 
Type strain of Actinoplanes couchii at BacDive -  the Bacterial Diversity Metadatabase

Micromonosporaceae
Bacteria described in 2007